Rablah (also spelled Rableh, Ribla or Ribleh) is a town in central Syria, administratively part of the Homs Governorate, located southwest of Homs. Just east of the border with Lebanon, nearby localities include al-Nizariyah to the southwest, Zita al-Gharbiyah to the northwest, al-Qusayr to the north, Zira'ah to the northeast and Hisyah to the east. According to the Central Bureau of Statistics (CBS), Rableh had a population of 5,328 in the 2004 census. Its inhabitants are predominantly Greek Catholics.

History
It is considered to be the site of the ancient town of Riblah, whose tell is covered by a cemetery not far from the modern town. In Roman times, the town also bore the name Daphne.

References

Bibliography

Populated places in al-Qusayr District
Melkite Christian communities in Syria